Evgeny Ilyich  Zharikov (26 February 1941 — 18 January 2012), also spelt Yevgeniy Ilich Zharikov and variants, was a Soviet and Russian film actor. He was awarded the USSR State Prize in 1978, and the title People's Artist of the RSFSR in 1989.

Early life and education 
Zharikov was born on February 26, 1941, in Moscow as the sixth and last child of the Soviet writer Leonid Zharikov (Ilya Milahievich Zharikov). He had a sister called Nina. He spent his childhood in the Moscow suburbs, near Zagorsk (now Sergiev Posad), with his grandparents, and from the age of four rode horses and mastered crafts. 

In 1959, he entered the Gerasimov Institute of Cinematography and first appeared in a film in his second year of study.

Career
In 1964, after graduation, he went to East Germany, where for two years he starred in the title role in the local series  Russian for You.  After his return in 1966, he acted in theater, television, and film in Moscow.  He became a member of the CPSU in 1970.

He came to fame appearing in the 1970s television series  about the formation of the Soviet militia and its fight against crime in the 1920s.  In 1970, at the height of his career, he was injured on the set of the film Death No, Guys! when he fell from a horse at full gallop, which injured his hip and caused a compression fracture of the spine.

From 1988 to 2000, he was  President of the Guild of Actors of Soviet Cinema (Russian Film Actors Guild from 1991), and founded the Sozvezdie International Film Festival, organised by the Guild and called "Constellation" in English.

He appeared in nearly 70 films and participated in the dubbing of more than 200 films.  He was sometimes compared to French actor Alain Delon, on account of his perceived attractiveness to women.

Awards 
 USSR State Prize (1978)
 Honored Artist of RSFSR  (1976)
 People's Artist of the RSFSR (1989)
 Order of Honour (1995)
 Order For Merit to the Fatherland 4th class (2001) 
 Medal In Commemoration of the 850th Anniversary of Moscow

Later life and death 
In 1999 he underwent two complex operations with prosthetics.

He died on 18 January 2012 of rectal cancer at the oncology center at Botkin Hospital in Moscow. He was buried on January 21 in the actors' section in Troyekurovskoye Cemetery.

Personal life 
Zharikov's nickname was Zhenya.

His first marriage (1962-1974) was to figure skating coach Valentina Zotova, who was several years older than he was, but they only lived together for a year, and got divorced after 12 years. He had affairs with other women, and  infected her with syphilis, which led to a hysterectomy.  

He married actress Natalya Gvozdikova (who was married at the time) after they met on the set of the TV series  (1974-1977). They had a son Fyodor (also spelt Fedor) Zharikov (born on 2 August 1976, who studied languages. Fyodor worked for a few years at an aircraft manufacturer, for social services, and later was appointed to a leadership position in the information security service.

From 1994 to 2001, Zharikov had an affair with journalist Tatyana   Sekridova (born 1960), who in 1995 gave birth to his son  Sergei  and daughter  Katya. After Sekridova went public with their relationship (reportedly having discovered the existence of a third woman in his life), Zharikov ended it, and Gvozdikova forgave her husband. Zharikov ceased contact with the children of this affair.

Selected filmography 
 But What If This Is Love (Russian: А если это любовь, 1961) as Sergei
 Ivan's Childhood (Иваново детство, 1962) as Lt. Galtsev
 Three Plus Two (Три плюс два, 1962) as Vadim
 Sold by Air (Продавец воздуха, 1966) as Luke
 Snegurochka (Снегурочка, 1968) as Lel
 Signals — Adventures in Space (Russian:Сигналы —  Приключения в космосе, Polish: Sygnały MMXX, Germann: Signale —  Ein Weltraumabenteuer, 1970) as Pavel
 Life and Strange Surprising Adventures of Robinson Crusoe  (Жизнь и удивительные приключения Робинзона Крузо, 1972) as ship captain
 Anvil or Hammer (Russian: Молот и наковальня, Bulgarian: Наковалня или чук, German: Amboss oder Hammer sein, 1972) as Igor
  (Рожденная революцией, 1974-77) as Nikolay Fomich Kondratiev 
 It Can't Be! (Не может быть!, 1975) as Nikolay 
 Long Road in the Dunes (Russian: Долгая дорога в дюнах, Latvian: Ilgais ceļš kāpās, 1980-81) as Otto Grünberg / Alexander Efimov
 Madame Wong Secrets (Тайны мадам Вонг, 1986) as ship captain
 Private Detective, or Operation Cooperation (Частный детектив, или Операция «Кооперация», 1989) as bootlegger
 The Gray Wolves  (Серые волки, 1993) as Alexander Shelepin
 Midnight in Saint Petersburg (Полночь в Санкт-Петербурге, 1995) as Feodor Zavarzin
 The Aristocratic Peasant Girl (Барышня-крестьянка, 1995) as Roschin
 Bless the Woman (Благословите женщину, 2003) as passenger on the train
 I'm Staying (Я остаюсь, 2007) as doctor Oleg Saprunov

References

External links
 
 
 Евгений Жариков. Глава из книги Фёдора Раззакова «Страсть»

1941 births
2012 deaths
Male actors from Moscow
Russian male film actors
Russian male television actors
Soviet male film actors
Deaths from cancer in Russia
People's Artists of the RSFSR
Recipients of the Order of Honour (Russia)
Honored Artists of the RSFSR
Recipients of the USSR State Prize
Gerasimov Institute of Cinematography alumni
Soviet male voice actors
Russian male voice actors
Communist Party of the Soviet Union members
Burials in Troyekurovskoye Cemetery